The Copa América de Ciclismo is a single-day road bicycle racing event held in Brazil. 
From 2001 to 2007 and in 2009 it took place at Autódromo José Carlos Pace, in São Paulo. The 2008 edition was held in a street circuit around Flamengo Park, in Rio de Janeiro. The race exists as both a men's and a women's competition. The men's competition is part of the UCI America Tour.

Men's winners

Women's winners

References
 Men's results
 Women's results

 
Cycle races in Brazil
Sport in São Paulo
Recurring sporting events established in 2001
UCI America Tour races
2001 establishments in Brazil
Women's road bicycle races